Waterless fracturing is an alternative to hydraulic fracturing in which liquefied petroleum gas (LPG) is formed by compressing propane gas into a thick gel. Propane is pumped into shale formations creating pressure of about 100–200 psi. The excessive pressure cracks the rocks and releases natural gases in the process. In waterless fracturing, most of the released gas is able to surface because the propane used does not block drilled pathways. During the pumping, LPG is converted into gas which guarantees a 100 % retrieval rate. In addition, the gel does not carry poisonous chemicals or underground radioactivity back to the surface and can be reused. Waterless fracturing is more expensive than hydraulic fracturing because propane costs more than water. Waterless fracturing also requires more monitoring because a propane leak could lead to an explosion.

LPG fracturing was developed by GasFrac, an energy company based in Calgary, Alberta, Canada. LGP fracturing has been in use since 2008 in gas well of Alberta, British Columbia, New Brunswick, Texas, Pennsylvania, Colorado, Oklahoma, and New Mexico.

References

Hydraulic fracturing